"7 Year Bitch" is a song by the British rock band Slade, released in 1985 as the second single from the band's twelfth studio album Rogues Gallery. The song was written by lead vocalist Noddy Holder and bassist Jim Lea, and produced by John Punter. It reached No. 60 in the UK, remaining in the charts for three weeks.

Background
Slade began recording Rogues Gallery in 1984 and in November that year, the lead single, "All Join Hands", was released and reached No. 15 in the UK. In January 1985, "7 Year Bitch" was released as the follow-up single, with both the band and RCA having high expectations for the song. However, the single stalled at No. 60 after it was banned by a number of UK broadcasters, largely due to the song's title. In a 1998 interview, Holder commented of the song: "That was a hit record, but we got a bit of a backlash".

Release
"7 Year Bitch" was released on 7" and 12" vinyl by RCA Records in the UK, Germany and Japan. The B-side, "Leave Them Girls Alone", was exclusive to the single and would later appear on the band's 2007 compilation B-Sides. On the 12" single, an extended version of "7 Year Bitch" was featured as the A-side, and a second B-side, a live version of "We'll Bring the House Down" was also included, taken from the 1982 live album Slade on Stage.

Promotion
A music video was filmed to promote the single, which was directed by Phillip Davey and shot at Ewert Studios in London. Slade's only video to feature sexual connotations, it featured the band performing the song in a large orange tent, with a group of women shown in various shots. Another segment of the video showed Slade dressed in convicts outfits, while the final scene had Slade sit down for a tea party with the women. During filming, Davey suggested the band and the women have a pie fight. Telling the band he would tell the group when to start, he secretly told the women to start whenever they like so that the band were hit in the face first. Recalling the video in 1986, Lea remembered the fight was "in good humour", but that it was quite rough. As a result, both Lea and guitarist Dave Hill suffered some cuts and some frames in the video show Lea's face covered in blood.

In 1985, the band performed the song on Saturday Live. It was also performed on German TV, on the shows Na Sowas!, Die Spielbude and Pro Koncert. In Norway, the song was performed on the NRK network at the official opening of the Scandic Hotel in Sandvika, Oslo.

Critical reception
In a retrospective review of the album, Sean Carruthers of AllMusic commented: ""7 Year Bitch" could have been a thoughtful look at someone who's attracted to younger women, but [it] kills off any chance of moral high ground with the question "...can you control the bitch?". Given the title of the album, perhaps such sentiments shouldn't be all that surprising."

Formats
7" Single
"7 Year Bitch" - 3:58
"Leave Them Girls Alone" - 3:13

12" Single
"7 Year Bitch (Extended Version)" - 5:38
"Leave Them Girls Alone" - 3:13
"We'll Bring the House Down (Live Version)" - 4:33

Cover versions
 In 1989, Lea revealed in a Slade fan club interview that he had recorded his own version of "7 Year Bitch", although his version remains unreleased to date. He stated that his version was "not like Slade's version."

Chart performance

Personnel
Slade
Noddy Holder - lead vocals
Jim Lea - bass, synthesiser, backing vocals, producer of "Leave Them Girls Alone" and "We'll Bring the House Down (Live)", arranger
Dave Hill - lead guitar, backing vocals
Don Powell - drums

Additional personnel
John Punter - producer of "7 Year Bitch"
The Square Red Studio - design
Chris Thomson - front photography
Simon Fowler - back photography

References

1985 singles
1985 songs
Slade songs
RCA Records singles
Songs written by Noddy Holder
Songs written by Jim Lea
Song recordings produced by John Punter